Alfred Allen (April 8, 1866 – June 18, 1947) was an American silent film actor and author.

Early life
Allen was born in Alfred, New York. His parents were Jonathan Macomber Allen (1823-1892), president of Alfred University, and Abigail Ann (Maxson) Allen (1824-1894). Alfred's siblings were William (b. 1853), Eva (b. 1856), and May (b. 1860).

He attended Harvard University, Johns Hopkins University, Columbia University, the American Academy of Dramatic Arts and the New England Conservatory of Music and earned his bachelor's and master's degrees at Alfred University.

Film
Allen was signed in 1915 and starred in 106 films before his retirement in 1935. (The reference book A Biographical Dictionary of Silent Film Western Actors and Actresses says, "He entered pictures at Universal City in 1913" and adds that he "appeared in 69 features from 1916 through 1929.")

Other professional activities
After his retirement from film, Allen became a writer and published several books.

Partial filmography

 Heartaches  (1916)
 A Yoke of Gold (1916)
 The Unattainable (1916)
 The Human Gamble (1916)
 Barriers of Society (1916)
 Hell Morgan's Girl (1917)
 The Flashlight (1917)
 The Reed Case (1917)
 The Gates of Doom (1917)
 The Flame of Youth (1917)
 Fighting Mad (1917)
 The Price of a Good Time (1917)
 The Grand Passion (1918)
 Nobody's Wife (1918)
 The Kaiser, the Beast of Berlin (1918)
 The Lion's Claws (1918)
 Painted Lips (1918)
 Kiss or Kill (1918)
 The Guilt of Silence (1918)
 The Eagle (1918)
 The Sea Flower (1918)
 Brace Up (1918)
 Winner Takes All (1918)
 Danger, Go Slow (1918)
 The Red Glove (1919)
 Riders of Vengeance (1919)
 The Sleeping Lion (1919)
 The Man in the Moonlight (1919)
 The Other Half (1919)
 Burning Daylight (1920)
 An Old Fashioned Boy (1920)
 The Broken Gate (1920)
 Blackmail (1920)
 The New Disciple (1921)
 The Sage Hen (1921)
 Shattered Idols (1922)
 The Pride of Palomar (1922)
 Colleen of the Pines (1922)
 The Grub-Stake (1923)
 Dead Game (1923)
 Shootin' for Love (1923)
 A Noise in Newboro (1923)
 Desert Driven (1923)
 A Gentleman of Leisure (1923)
 The Miracle Baby (1923)
 The Ghost City (1923)
 White Tiger (1923)
 The Dramatic Life of Abraham Lincoln (1924)
 Stolen Secrets (1924)
 Dangerous Innocence (1925)
 Perils of the Wild (1925)
 Bustin' Thru (1925)
 Speed (1925)
 The Mystery Club (1926)
 Rolling Home (1926)
 Singed (1927)
 The Magic Garden (1927)
 Underworld (1927)
 Out All Night (1927)
 Under the Tonto Rim (1928)
 The Fifty-Fifty Girl (1928)
 Hot News (1928)
 Anybody Here Seen Kelly? (1928)
 The Flying Fleet (1929) (uncredited)
 Sunset Pass (1929)
 New Adventures of Get Rich Quick Wallingford (1931)

References

External links

allmovie;bio

1860s births
1947 deaths
American male silent film actors
Male actors from New York (state)
Male actors from Los Angeles
People from Alfred, New York
20th-century American male actors
Harvard University alumni
Johns Hopkins University alumni
Columbia University alumni
American Academy of Dramatic Arts alumni
New England Conservatory alumni
Alfred University alumni
20th-century American male writers